Plan for Destruction is a 1943 American short propaganda film directed by Edward Cahn. It looks at the Geopolitik ideas of the ex-World War I professor, General Karl Haushofer, who is portrayed as the head of a huge organisation for gathering information of strategic value and the mastermind behind Adolf Hitler's wars and plans to enslave the world. The film was nominated for an Academy Award for Best Documentary Short.

Cast
 Lewis Stone as himself - Commentator
 Frank Reicher as Karl Ernst Haushofer
 George Lynn as Rudolf Hess

References

External links
 
 
 

1943 films
1940s short documentary films
Black-and-white documentary films
1943 short films
American short documentary films
American World War II propaganda shorts
American black-and-white films
Metro-Goldwyn-Mayer short films
Films directed by Edward L. Cahn
Documentary films about World War II
1940s English-language films
1940s American films